(Japan Pharmaceuticals) is a Japanese company that was founded in 1916 as the first industrial explosives manufacturer in Japan under the company name Nippon Kayaku Seizo Co., Ltd.. Its main business areas are functional chemicals, pharmaceuticals, safety systems and agrochemicals.
It has 8 plants and 4 laboratories in Japan. It also has subsidiaries in different countries around the world. It is listed on the Nikkei 225.

History
The company was established in 1916 to produce explosives for the construction sector. The firm then diversified into chemical dyes and pharmaceuticals in the interwar period.

By 1950, Nippon Kayaku had established itself as the ninth leading pharmaceutical firm in Japan. The launch of its anticancer drug, bleomycin, strengthened the firm's pharmaceutical business.

Products 
Major products made by Nippon Kayaku are: epoxy resins, UV-curing type resins, functional films, colors for inkjet printers, catalysts, dyes pharmaceuticals, pharmaceutical API and intermediates, diagnostics, airbag inflators, micro gas generators for seatbelt pretensioners, squibs, and agrochemicals.

References

External links

 Nippon Kayaku official site 

Pharmaceutical companies of Japan
Chemical companies based in Tokyo
Pharmaceutical companies based in Tokyo
Defense companies of Japan
Manufacturing companies based in Tokyo
Companies listed on the Tokyo Stock Exchange
Pharmaceutical companies established in 1916
Japanese companies established in 1916
Japanese brands